Visitors to Tanzania must obtain a visa from one of the Tanzanian diplomatic missions or online unless they come from one of the visa exempt countries or countries whose citizens can obtain a visa on arrival.

Visa policy map

Visa exemption 
Citizens of the following countries and territories can visit Tanzania without a visa for up to 3 months:

Holders of diplomatic or service/official/special passports issued to nationals of Brazil, China, India and Turkey do not require a visa for Tanzania.

In addition, in July 2018, a visa waiver agreement was concluded with South Korea for diplomatic and official passport holders. (Currently in effect.)

Visa on arrival 
All other nationalities, not included in the next chapter, that are not visa exempt may obtain a visa on arrival. Visa must be paid with notes of USD 50 or USD 100. The length of stay is determined at ports of entry.

Visa required

Citizens of the following countries and territories must obtain a visa in advance as they require approval of the Commissioner General of Immigration or the Commissioner of Immigration:

The same regulation applies to stateless persons and persons with refugee status.

eVisa
Tanzania introduced an eVisa system on 26 November 2018. It is obligatory to have a visa to enter Tanzania unless you are from one of a few countries which are visa exempt. When traveling to the country this normally presents you with two options. You can either enter with a prearranged Tanzania eVisa or get a visa on arrival.

Mandatory vaccination 

Proof of Yellow fever vaccination is required for all travellers travelling through or from the following countries: Angola, Argentina, Benin, Bolivia, Brazil, Burkina Faso, Burundi, Cameroon, Central African Republic, Chad, Colombia, Republic of the Congo, Democratic Republic of the Congo, Côte d'Ivoire, Ecuador, Equatorial Guinea, Ethiopia, French Guiana, Gabon, Gambia, Ghana, Guinea, Guinea-Bissau, Guyana, Kenya, Liberia, Mali, Mauritania, Niger, Nigeria, Panama, Paraguay, Peru, Rwanda, Senegal, Sierra Leone, South Sudan, Sudan, Suriname, Togo, Trinidad and Tobago, Uganda, Venezuela, Zambia. The Tanzanian ministry of health mandates a transit time of more than 12 hours or a disembarkment from the immediate airport area from the above mentioned countries during transit as a possible health threat and requires travelers in such situations to possess Yellow Fever Certificates.

Visitor statistics
Most visitors arriving to Tanzania were from the following countries of nationality:

See also

 Visa requirements for Tanzanian citizens

External links
Immigration Department of Tanzania
eVisa Tanzania
Tanzania eVisa Requirements
eVisa Information for Tanzania

References

Tanzania
Foreign relations of Tanzania